The 1915 All-Ireland Senior Football Championship was the 29th staging of Ireland's premier Gaelic football knock-out competition. Wexford won the first title of their four-in-a-row. They ended Kerry's bid for 3 in a row until 1931.

Results

Connacht Senior Football Championship

Leinster Senior Football Championship

Munster Senior Football Championship

Ulster Senior Football Championship

An objection was made and a replay ordered.

All-Ireland Senior Football Championship

Championship statistics

Miscellaneous
 Wexford win their second All Ireland football title first since 1893.

References